Arturo Brizio Carter (born 9 March 1956) is a Mexican former association football referee. He is mostly known for supervising six matches in the FIFA World Cup, three each in 1994 and 1998. He gave seven red cards (a record for the tournament) and 29 yellow cards in those six matches.

He was the first referee to wear a coloured uniform in the World Cup.

External links
 
 
 
 
 

1956 births
Sportspeople from Mexico City
Mexican people of Italian descent
Mexican people of English descent
Mexican football referees
FIFA World Cup referees
Copa América referees
Living people
1994 FIFA World Cup referees
1998 FIFA World Cup referees
CONCACAF Gold Cup referees
Olympic football referees